Kilkenny is a surname. Notable persons with that surname include:

 Allison Kilkenny (born 1983), American journalist and podcaster
 Jimmy Kilkenny (1934–2003), footballer
 John C. Kilkenny, film executive
 John Kilkenny (1901–1995), U.S. federal judge
 Mike Kilkenny (1945–2018), Canadian baseball player
 Neil Kilkenny (born 1985), English-born Australian footballer
 Niamh Kilkenny (born 1989), camogie player
 Ollie Kilkenny (born 1962), hurler
 Tony Kilkenny (born 1959), hurler